Hepzibah is an unincorporated community in Taylor County, West Virginia, United States.

References

Unincorporated communities in Taylor County, West Virginia
Unincorporated communities in West Virginia